The Bjørgvin-class coastal battleships were ordered by Norway in 1912 to supplement the older  and s. The two ships laid down were compulsorily purchased by the Royal Navy when World War I broke out, and classified as monitors. The British government paid Norway £370,000 as compensation for each ship.

Ships in class
  (1912) - Compulsorily purchased by the British Navy and renamed , blew up in September 1918.
  (1912) - Compulsorily purchased by the British Navy and renamed .

Description
The Bjørgvin class would be significantly more heavily armed than the previous Eidsvold class:
 Two 24 cm/50 guns, which in British service were relined to use standard British ammunition and became 9.2"/51. These were considered among the longest-ranged guns in the world in 1918. As designed, they would have fired a 190 kg (419 lb) projectile with a muzzle velocity of 884 m/s (2,900 ft/s), capable of penetrating 22.2 cm (8.75 in) of face-hardened armour at a range of 7,000 m (7,650 yards).
 Four 15 cm/50 in single turrets - one aft, one fore, two midships (one on either side). In British service they were relined to take standard 6 inch (15.2 cm) ammunition.
 Six 10 cm (3.94 in) guns.
 Two submerged torpedo tubes.
In addition to the heavier armament, the two ships of the Bjørgvin class were also significantly better armoured, with her armour better distributed:
 7 inch (17.78 cm) thick armour in the belt
 8 inch (20.32 cm) thick armour on the turrets
 8 inch (20.32 cm) thick armour in the barbettes
 2.5 inch (6.35 cm) thick armoured deck
 8 inch (20.32 cm) thick armour on the conning tower
 4 inch (10,16 cm) thick armoured bulkheads

Notes

References
 Model of KNM Bjørgnvin, from the website of the Norwegian Armed Forces Museum, retrieved 9 December 2005
 On guns, see Notes.
 Naval History via Flix: KNM Nidaros, retrieved 11 December 2005
 Naval History via Flix: Technical Details of Ship HMS Gorgon, retrieved 9 December 2005

External links
 Model of KNM Bjørgnvin, head on view
 Details of the forecastle and details of bridge.
 The loss of the HMS Glatton, an "interesting little ship", retrieved 15 January 2007

Coastal defense ship classes